Biysultan Khamzayev (born 24 May 1982, Khasavyurt, Dagestan Autonomous Soviet Socialist Republic) is a Russian political figure and deputy of the 8th State Duma.

In 2012, he initiated and created the project "Sober Russia" that aimed to popularize a healthy lifestyle and fight alcohol, drug, and tobacco addictions. From 2014 to 2021, he was a member of the Civic Chamber of the Russian Federation of the 5th, 6th, and 7th convocations. In 2014–2017, he was the First Deputy Chairman of the Commission of the Civic Chamber of the Russian Federation for Support of Youth Initiatives. Since September 2021, he has served as a deputy of the 8th State Duma from the Dagestan constituency.

Biysultan Khamzayev publicly stands for prohibiting selling alcohol during the weekends, tightening penalties for counterfeiting alcohol, introducing the death penalty for pedophiles, repeat offenders and murderers, and prohibiting selling tobacco to people born after 2014.

On 24 March 2022, the United States Treasury sanctioned him in response to the 2022 Russian invasion of Ukraine.

References

1982 births
Living people
United Russia politicians
21st-century Russian politicians
Eighth convocation members of the State Duma (Russian Federation)
Russian individuals subject to the U.S. Department of the Treasury sanctions